"Red, White and Blue" is a song written and originally performed by American country music artist Loretta Lynn. It was released as a single in March 1976 via MCA Records.

Background and reception 
"Red, White and Blue" was recorded at the Bradley's Barn on January 30, 1975. Located in Mount Juliet, Tennessee, the session was produced by renowned country music producer Owen Bradley. Two additional tracks were recorded during this session. 

"Red, White and Blue" reached number twenty on the Billboard Hot Country Singles survey in 1975. Additionally, the song peaked at number twenty six on the Canadian RPM Country Songs chart during this same period. It was included on her studio album, When the Tingle Becomes a Chill (1976).

Track listings 
7" vinyl single
 "Red, White and Blue" – 2:14
 "Sounds of a New Love (Being Born)" – 2:37

Charts

Weekly charts

References 

1976 songs
1976 singles
MCA Records singles
Loretta Lynn songs
Songs written by Loretta Lynn
Song recordings produced by Owen Bradley